The Black Death was the deadliest pandemic recorded in human history.

Black Death may also refer to:

Arts and entertainment
  Black Death (film), a 2010 British horror film directed by Christopher Smith
  The Black Death (novel), a 1992 novel by Basil Copper
 The Black Death, a 1977 novel by Gwyneth Cravens
 Quiet Killer or Black Death, a 1992 Canadian television film of the novel

Music
 Black Death (American band), an American heavy metal band
 Black Death (album), their debut album
 "Black Death" (song), a hard rock song by Arrogance
 Darkthrone, a Norwegian band originally named Black Death
 "The Black Death", a song from the 2015 musical Something Rotten!
 "The Black Death", an album by When (band)

Other uses
 Black Death Group, an apparent criminal organization on the dark web
 African buffalo, nicknamed "The Black Death" reflecting the dangerousness of the species
 Brennivín, an Icelandic schnapps sometimes called Black Death
 Russian Naval Infantry, nicknamed "Black Death" in reference to its combat effectiveness and black uniforms
 Joseph Henry Blackburne (1841–1924), British chess player
 Henry Johnson (World War I soldier) (1892-1929) an African-American soldier in World War I

See also
 Blackened death metal, an extreme metal music genre